The Museum Press was a British fiction and non-fiction publisher, based in London, that was active in the post-Second World War period up to the 1960s.

Selected titles
Honey and your health: A nutrimental, medicinal & historical commentary. Bodog F. Beck, revised by Dorée Smedley, 1947.
The Lurker at the Threshold, H P Lovecraft & August Derleth, 1948
Hounds of Tindalos, Frank Belknap Long, 1950
The Puppet Masters, Robert A Heinlein, 1953
Cockney Cats. Warren Tute & Felix Fonteyn, 1953.
Assignment in Eternity, Robert A Heinlein, 1954
One Crowded Hour. Alan Hoby, 1954.
Sentinels from Space, Eric Frank Russell, 1954
Landscape With Churches. G. M. Durant, 1965

See also
British Museum Press

References 

Publishing companies of the United Kingdom
Defunct companies based in London